Claire Chevallier (born in 1969) is a Franco-Belgian pianist who specializes in the fortepiano.

Biography 
Chevallier studied piano at the Conservatoires of Nancy and Strasbourg (class of Hélène Boschi) then with Bruno Rigutto in Paris. She received a First Prize for piano and chamber music.

It was during a masterclass given by Jos van Immerseel that she was fascinated by the fortepiano and therefore interested, as musician and researcher, in the historical contexts of the instruments and their technical evolution.

Since 2004 she has been teaching the fortepiano at the Royal Conservatory of Brussels. Since 2007, she has been a member of the Jury of the International Competition of fortepiano organized by the Festival Musica Antiqua of Bruges. She is also a member of the jury of the 1st Frédéric Chopin International Competition on period instruments.

Chevallier has built up a collection of  pianos dating from the period 1842 to 1920.

Recordings 
Claire Chevallier particular recorded on Erard piano vintage works for two pianos by Franck, Saint-Saens and Francis Poulenc (with Jos van Immerseel). She has also recorded Moussorgski's Pictures at an Exhibition and Ravel's Piano Concerto for the Left Hand (with the orchestra Anima Eterna from Bruges). It is also on an Érard piano that she plays both Légendes de Saint François by Liszt recorded on the album Fever (La dolce volta/Harmonia Mundi).

References

External links 
 Ravel : Concerto pour piano et orchestre en ré majeur, pour la main gauche, Claire Chevallier and Jos van Immersel (pianos Erard 1897 and 1904)
 Collection de claviers de Claire Chevallier  
 Official website
 Claire Chevallier's discography
 Claire Chevallier on France Culture
 Claire Chevalier on Pianoforte
 Claire Chevallier on Flâneries musicales de Reims

21st-century French women classical pianists
Belgian classical pianists
Academic staff of the Royal Conservatory of Brussels
1969 births
Living people
Women music educators